Fawcett Publications was an American publishing company founded in 1919 in Robbinsdale, Minnesota by Wilford Hamilton "Captain Billy" Fawcett (1885–1940). 

It kicked off with the publication of the bawdy humor magazine Captain Billy's Whiz Bang and expanded into a magazine empire with the first issue of Mechanix Illustrated in the 1920s, followed by numerous titles including True Confessions, Family Circle, Woman's Day, and True. Fawcett Comics, which began operating in 1939, led to the introduction of Captain Marvel. The company became a publisher of paperbacks in 1950 with the opening of Gold Medal Books.

In 1953, the company abandoned its roster of superhero comic characters in the wake of declining sales and a lawsuit for infringement by the Captain Marvel character on the copyright of the Action Comics character Superman, and ended its publication of comic books. It was purchased by CBS Publications in 1977 and subsequently underwent dismantling and absorption by other companies.

Captain Billy's Whiz Bang 
At the age of 16, Fawcett ran away from home to join the Army, and the Spanish–American War took him to the Philippines. Back in Minnesota, he became a police reporter for the Minneapolis Journal. While a World War I Army captain, Fawcett's experience with the Army publication Stars and Stripes gave him the notion to get into publishing. His bawdy cartoon and joke magazine, Captain Billy's Whiz Bang, became the launchpad for a vast publishing empire embracing magazines, comic books and paperback books.

The title Captain Billy's Whiz Bang combined Fawcett's military moniker with the nickname of a destructive World War I artillery shell. According to one account, the earliest issues were mimeographed pamphlets, typed on a borrowed typewriter and peddled around Minneapolis by Captain Billy and his four sons. However, in Captain Billy's version, he stated that when he began publishing in October 1919, he ordered a print run of 5,000 copies because of the discount on a large order compared with rates for only several hundred copies. Distributing free copies of Captain Billy's Whiz Bang to wounded veterans and his Minnesota friends, he then circulated the remaining copies to newsstands in hotels. With gags like, "AWOL means After Women Or Liquor", the joke book caught on, and in 1921, Captain Billy made the highly inflated claim that sales of Whiz Bang  were "soaring to the million mark."

The book Humor Magazines and Comic Periodicals notes:
Few periodicals reflect the post-WW I cultural change in American life as well as Captain Billy’s Whiz Bang. To some people [it] represented the decline of morality and the flaunting of sexual immodesty; to others it signified an increase in openness. For much of the 1920s, Captain Billy’s was the most prominent comic magazine in America with its mix of racy poetry and naughty jokes and puns, aimed at a small-town audience with pretensions of "sophistication".
Captain Billy's Whiz Bang has been immortalized in the lyrics to the song "Ya Got Trouble" from Meredith Willson's 1957 Broadway musical The Music Man: "Is there a nicotine stain on his index finger? A dime novel hidden in the corncrib? Is he starting to memorize jokes from Captain Billy's Whiz Bang?"

The publication, delivered in a 64-page, saddle-stitched, digest-sized format, soon saw a dramatic increase in sales. By 1923, the magazine had a circulation of 425,000 with $500,000 annual profits. With the rising readership of Captain Billy's Whiz Bang, Fawcett racked up more sales with Whiz Bang annuals, and in 1926, he launched a similar publication, Smokehouse Monthly. The popularity of Whiz Bang peaked during the 1920s. It continued into the 1930s, but circulation slowed as readers graduated to the more sophisticated humor of Esquire, founded in 1933. It had an influence on many other digest-sized cartoon humor publications, including Charley Jones Laugh Book, which was still being published during the 1950s.

In some issues of Whiz Bang, Captain Billy wrote about his vacations in Los Angeles, Miami, New York and Paris, along with items about his celebrity friends, including Jack Dempsey, Sinclair Lewis, and Ring Lardner.

March of the magazines
During the 1930s, Fawcett and his sons established a line of magazines which eventually reached a combined circulation of ten million a month in newsstand sales. True Confessions alone had a circulation of two million a month. However, during the World War II paper shortages Fawcett folded 49 magazines and kept only 14. Magazines published by Fawcett over the decades included Battle Stories, Cavalier, Daring Detective, Dynamic Detective, Family Circle, Hollywood, Motion Picture, Movie Story, Rudder (later merged with Sea), Screen Secrets, Secrets, Triple-X Western and True. Woman's Day, added to the line-up in 1948, had a circulation of 6,500,000 by 1965.

The flagship of Fawcett magazines was Mechanix Illustrated. It began in the 1920s as Modern Mechanics and Inventions, was retitled Modern Mechanix and Inventions, shortened to Modern Mechanix and then altered to Mechanix Illustrated before it became Home Mechanix in 1984. Acquired by Time Inc., it was retitled yet again to become Today's Homeowner in 1993.

The illustrator Norman Saunders became a Fawcett staffer in 1927 after doing some spot illustrations for Fawcett editor Weston "Westy" Farmer, and Saunders' first cover illustration was for the August 1929 issue of Modern Mechanics and Inventions. He continued to do covers for Fawcett into the 1930s, and when Fawcett opened Manhattan offices in 1934, Saunders and other staffers relocated to New York.

Larry Eisinger, the workshop and science editor of Mechanix Illustrated, spearheaded the national "do-it-yourself" movement as the editor-in-chief of Fawcett's How-To book series and special interest magazines. He created Fawcett's Mechanix Illustrated Do-It-Yourself Encyclopedia and The Practical Handyman's Encyclopedia, which had combined sales of almost 20 million copies. In 1959 Electronics Illustrated was created for the hobbyist. It was merged into Mechanix Illustrated at the end of 1972.

After the huge growth during the early 1930s, Fawcett Publications relocated its offices to both New York City and Greenwich, Connecticut in 1940. Corporate headquarters was in Greenwich, and the book publishing division, known as Fawcett World Library, operated out of New York City, at 67 West 44th Street.

Fawcett Comics 
Wilford Fawcett's sons continued the expansion of the company after their father's death on February 7, 1940. That same month was the cover date of the first comic book released under the aegis of Fawcett Comics. Fawcett writer William Parker and Fawcett staff artist Charles Clarence Beck devised Captain Marvel, who was introduced in Whiz Comics #2 (released in December 1939 with a February 1940 cover date). The character caught on quickly, moving from Whiz Comics into his own title, Captain Marvel Adventures, early in 1941. The success prompted spin-off characters, beginning with Captain Marvel Jr. in 1941 and Mary Marvel in 1942. Fawcett's line of comics expanded with such colorful characters as Captain Midnight, Bulletman and Bulletgirl, Nyoka the Jungle Girl and Spy Smasher (who became Crime Smasher after World War II). The circulation of Captain Marvel Adventures continued to soar until it outsold Superman during the mid-1940s. Captain Marvel Jr. had such an impact on Elvis Presley that he borrowed the character's poses, hairstyle and lightning flash chest insignia, as described in Elaine Dundy's biography, Elvis and Gladys.

A declining comics market in the 1950s, along with a major lawsuit (National Comics Publications v. Fawcett Publications), resulted in Fawcett folding its line of comic books. Lash Larue, Nyoka, Strange Suspense Stories and other titles were sold to Charlton Comics. In 1972, DC Comics (by then a subsidiary of Warner Brothers as it is today) licensed Captain Marvel, featuring him in new stories. In 1991, DC purchased the entire Marvel Family and related characters outright.

Gold Medal Books

Fawcett was also an independent newsstand distributor, and in 1945, the company negotiated a contract with New American Library to distribute their Mentor and Signet titles. This contract prohibited Fawcett from becoming a competitor by publishing their own paperback reprints. In 1949, Roscoe Fawcett wanted to establish a line of Fawcett paperbacks, and he felt original paperbacks would not be a violation of the contract. In order to test a loophole in the contract, Fawcett published two anthologies – The Best of True Magazine and What Today's Woman Should Know About Marriage and Sex – reprinting material from Fawcett magazines not previously published in books. When these books successfully sailed through the contract loophole, Fawcett announced Gold Medal Books, their line of paperback originals. It was a revolutionary turning point in paperback publishing. Fawcett's editor-in-chief was Ralph Daigh, who had been hired by Captain Billy in 1928, and the art director for Gold Medal was Al Allard, who also had been with Fawcett since 1928.

Gold Medal's first editor was Jim Bishop, a former Collier's editor later known for his series of best-selling non-fiction titles: The Day Lincoln Was Shot, The Day Christ Died and The Day Kennedy Was Shot. When Bishop left after a year, he was replaced by William Charles Lengel (1888–1965), a veteran magazine editor, agent, short story author and novelist (Forever and Ever, Candles in the Wind). In February 1951, former Hollywood story editor Richard Carroll signed on as an editor with Gold Medal. Carroll was once described as "the Maxwell Perkins of Gold Medal."

Another early Gold Medal editor was former literary agent Knox Burger, who recalled, "Through its Gold Medal series, Fawcett was able to give many now well-known authors a chance at book publication early in their careers – among them John D. MacDonald and Kurt Vonnegut. It also gave established writers like William Goldman and MacKinlay Kantor a chance to flex their creative muscles under pseudonyms."

Radcliffe graduate Rona Jaffe, who joined the company in the early 1950s as a file clerk, was promoted to an associate editor position. After four years at Fawcett, she left to pursue a writing career. Her best-selling 1958 novel, The Best of Everything, obviously drawn from her experiences at Fawcett and Gold Medal, was adapted for a 1959 film and a 1970 TV series. At the time of Jaffe's departure from Fawcett in 1955, the new associate editor who stepped in was Leona Nevler, formerly with Little, Brown but best known in 1950s publishing circles as the person who saw the potential of Grace Metalious' best-selling Peyton Place after picking it from the slush pile at publisher Julian Messner. During her 26 years at Fawcett, Nevler became the editorial director in 1972.

Beginning their numbering system at 101, Gold Medal got underway with Alan Hynd's We Are the Public Enemies, the anthology Man Story (102) and John Flagg's The Persian Cat (103). Writing about the demise of pulp magazines in The Dime Detectives, Ron Goulart observed, "Fawcett dealt another blow to the pulps when, in 1950, it introduced its Gold Medal line. What Gold Medal specialized in was original novels. Some were merely sleazy, but others were in a tough, hard-boiled style that seemed somehow more knowing and more contemporary than that of the surviving pulps. Early Gold Medal authors included John D. MacDonald, Charles Williams and Richard S. Prather." Others were Benjamin Appel, Bruno Fischer, David Goodis, Day Keene, Dan J. Marlowe, Wade Miller, Jim Thompson, Lionel White and Harry Whittington.

Interviewed by Ed Gorman in 1984, MacDonald recalled, "In late 1949, I wrote a long pulp novelette. My agent, Joe Shaw, asked me to expand it. I resisted, but complied. I hate puffing things. Cutting is fine. Everything can use cutting. But puffing creates fat. Gold Medal took it for their new line of originals. It was titled The Brass Cupcake." Numbered as Gold Medal 124, The Brass Cupcake was John D. MacDonald's first novel.

Gold Medal 129 was an unusual graphic novel experiment, John Millard's Mansion of Evil, an original color comic book story packaged as a paperback. Other 1950 Gold Medal originals included the Western Stretch Dawson by William R. Burnett and three mystery-adventure novels – Nude in Mink by Sax Rohmer, I'll Find You by Richard Himmel. After Donald E. Keyhoe's article "Flying Saucers Are Real" in True (January 1950) created a sold-out sensation, with True going back to press for another print run, Keyhoe expanded the article into a top-selling paperback, The Flying Saucers Are Real, published by Fawcett that same year.

Sales soared, prompting Ralph Daigh to comment, "In the past six months we have produced 9,020,645 books, and people seem to like them very well." However, hardcover publishers resented Roscoe Fawcett's innovation, as evidenced by Doubleday's LeBaron R. Barker, who claimed that paperback originals could "undermine the whole structure of publishing."

With an increase from 35 titles in 1950 to 66 titles in 1951, Gold Medal's obvious success in issuing paperback originals revolutionized the industry. While Fischer, MacKinlay Kantor, Louis L'Amour, John D. MacDonald, Richard Matheson and Richard Prather were joining Gold Medal's roster of writers, other paperback publishers were soon asking agents for original manuscripts. Literary agent Donald MacCampbell stated that one publisher "threatened to boycott my agency if it continued to negotiate contracts with original 25-cent firms."

Prather had a bank account of $100 when his wife handed him a telegram from literary agent Scott Meredith on July 7, 1950 indicating his first sale. Although Prather's first novel was unsold, Gold Medal liked his second novel and his Shell Scott character enough to offer a four-book contract, and Prather's Case of the Vanishing Beauty soon set sales records.

In 1950, Bruno Fischer's House of Flesh sold 1,800,212 copies. In 1951, Charles Williams' Hill Girl sold 1,226,890 copies, Gil Brewer's 13 French Street sold 1,200,365 and Cassidy's Girl by David Goodis sold 1,036,497. Authors were attracted to Gold Medal because royalties were based on print runs rather than actual sales, and they received the entire royalty instead of a 50-50 split with a hardback publisher. Gold Medal paid a $2000 advance on an initial print run was for 200,000 copies. When a print run increased to 300,000, the advance was $3000.

Mickey Spillane's I, the Jury paperback bestseller got a huge boost from Fawcett, as Spillane explained to interviewer Michael Carlson:

In 1952, when their contract with NAL expired, Fawcett immediately began doing reprints through several imprints. Red Seal started April 1952 and published 22 titles before it folded a year later. Launched September 1955, Premier Books offered non-fiction titles, such as The Art of Thinking by Ernest Dimnet. Crest Books, which also premiered in September 1955, spanned all genres with an emphasis on Westerns and humor, including Best Cartoons from True and Lester Grady's Best from Captain Billy's Whiz Bang, and one successful Crest title was their movie tie-in edition of Robert Bloch's Psycho. Fawcett Crest was perhaps best known for their many abridged collections of the Peanuts comic strip titles originally published by Holt, Rinehart and Winston.  The managing editor of Fawcett Crest and Premier was Leona Nevler.

Between 1960 and 1993, Gold Medal was the exclusive American publisher of Donald Hamilton's Matt Helm spy novel series. In the early 1960s, John D. MacDonald's Travis McGee series got underway after Knox Burger contacted MacDonald: "At the request of Knox Burger, then at Fawcett, I attempted a series character. I took three shots at it to get one book with a character I could stay with. That was in 1964. Once I had the first McGee book, The Deep Blue Good-by, they held it up until I had finished two more, Nightmare in Pink and A Purple Place for Dying, then released one a month for three months. That launched the series."

After his retirement in 1972, Daigh recalled, "From our entrance into the paperback business, we paid authors at a more generous rate than had been the custom. In 1955, when we started the Crest line to reprint hardcover books, we extended this practice to what we offered for softcover rights. It caused quite a sensation in the trade when we paid $101,505 for James Gould Cozzens' By Love Possessed and later $700,000 for James A. Michener's The Source. Giving the author a bigger share of the pie paid off handsomely. However, I gather that the practice has been overdone in recent years and has led to some of the book industry's current troubles."

The Fawcett family

Captain Billy and Claire Fawcett had four sons and a daughter: Roger, Wilford, Marion Claire, Gordon Wesley and the youngest, Roscoe. As a boy, Roscoe Kent Fawcett (February 7, 1913 – December 23, 1999) attended Minneapolis schools and was assigned tasks such as dusting furniture and beach cleaning at his father's Breezy Point Resort before he became a vice president and circulation manager for the family publishing company.

Roscoe Fawcett was a veteran of World War II, serving in the anti-aircraft division of the U.S. Army, and later was in charge of entertainment for Camp Haan in Riverside, California. He was married twice, had four sons and died at the age of 86 in Brainerd, Minnesota. One of his sons, Roscoe Fawcett Jr., became the publisher of American Fitness magazine.

Born in Minneapolis in 1912, Gordon Fawcett graduated from the University of Minnesota in 1934. He married Vivian Peterson in 1935 and moved to Los Angeles where he was Fawcett Publications' office manager. He held the title of secretary-treasurer when the company moved to Greenwich, Connecticut in 1940, and he was 81 when he died in West Palm Beach, Florida, on January 16, 1993. Gordon Fawcett had four children: Vivian Creigh of Tucson, Arizona, and his three sons, Dennis of Greenwich; David of Stuart, Florida; and Gordon Jr. of San Diego.

Acquisition and recent history
In 1970, Fawcett acquired Popular Library from Perfect Film & Chemical Corporation. Fawcett Publications was bought by CBS Publications in 1977 for $50 million. Ballantine Books (a division of Random House) acquired most of Fawcett Books in 1982 (Popular was sold to Warner Communications) it inherited a mass market paperback list with such authors as William Bernhardt, Amanda Cross, Stephen Frey, P. D. James, William X. Kienzle, Anne Perry, Daniel Silva, Peter Straub and Margaret Truman. Fawcett also became the official home of Ballantine's mass market mystery program. The imprint stopped being used on new books at the beginning of the 21st century.

In 1987, Fawcett senior executive Peter G. Diamandis and a management team negotiated a $650 million leveraged buy out, then sold six titles to raise $250 million. Diamandis Communications, Inc. was then sold the next year to Hachette Publications for $712 million.

An annual four-day festival held in Robbinsdale, Minnesota, is Whiz Bang Days. Robbinsdale's city celebration, recalling the glory years of Fawcett Publications, began during World War II. The original Fawcett Publications building, which remained standing in Robbinsdale for decades, was torn down during the mid-1990s. It was located at what is now the terrace for the restaurant La Cucina di Nonna Rosa's, at 4168 West Broadway Avenue.

Notes

References

Sources
 Walters, Ray. "Paperback Talk", The New York Times (April 11, 1982).
 Sloane, David E. E., American Humor Magazines and Comic Periodicals (Greenwood Press, 1987)pp. 40–44ff.

External links

 About  Comics
 Vin Packer and Gold Medal Books
 Richard S. Prather Interview by Linda Pendleton
 Richard S. Prather Bibliography
 Capt. Billy's Whiz Bang from the Minnesota Historical Society

 
1919 establishments in Minnesota
American companies established in 1919
Publishing companies established in 1919
1977 disestablishments in Connecticut
American companies disestablished in 1977
Publishing companies disestablished in 1977
1977 mergers and acquisitions
1982 mergers and acquisitions
Defunct book publishing companies of the United States
Comic book publishing companies of the United States
Fawcett Comics
Magazine publishing companies of the United States
Military humor
Former CBS Corporation subsidiaries
Hennepin County, Minnesota
Defunct companies based in Minnesota
Book publishing companies based in Minnesota
Companies based in Greenwich, Connecticut
Defunct companies based in Connecticut
Book publishing companies based in Connecticut